The list of shipwrecks in 1765 includes some ships sunk, wrecked or otherwise lost during 1765.

January

10 January

15 January

21 January

23 January

26 January

31 January

Unknown date

February

8 February

9 February

14 February

19 February

24 February

26 February

27 February

Unknown date

March

6 March

8 March

27 March

Unknown date

April

6 April

9 April

25 April

Unknown date

May

11 May

15 May

June

Unknown date

July

31 July

August

6 August

14 August

31 August

Unknown date

September

10 September

15 September

17 September

30 September

Unknown date

October

5 October

Unknown date

November

4 November

5 November

7 November

Unknown date

December

9 December

11 December

12 December

14 December

17 December

31 December

Unknown date

Unknown date

References

1765